Selina May Hornibrook (née Gilsenan born 31 May 1978) is a retired Australian netball player. Hornibrook has Rotuman ancestry from her mother.

Career
After a successful year playing in the Commonwealth Bank Trophy premiership-winning team in 2001, national selectors identified Hornibrook's talent and she received her first invitation to join the Australian squad in 2002. However it was not until early 2005 that she received her first call up to the Australian open team, making her debut in a match against England, which Australia won by 40 goals.

A rib injury forced Hornibrook out of Australian team contention for the next international test series, but she fought her way back into contention in late 2005, and has been a permanent member of the team ever since. She was one of Australia's best on court in a silver-medal-winning performance in the 2006 Commonwealth Games final, and after a sterling performance against New Zealand mid-year, cemented her position as Australia's first-choice wing defence.

One of netball's most consistent players, Hornibrook is noted for her speed and persistence, being nicknamed "the rash" by some opponents. She has been an integral member of the Sydney Swifts national league team since 2000, and has played a key role in their four premierships (2001, 2004, 2006 and 2007). She was named the best player on court in the 2007 grand final. A versatile player and natural athlete, she forms a formidable combination with fellow Australian representatives Liz Ellis and Mo'onia Gerrard, and rarely puts in a poor performance.

After a short but very successful career with the Australian team, Hornibrook announced her retirement from international netball after Australia won the 2007 World Netball Championships along with Laura von Bertouch and Liz Ellis. In 2008, Hornibrook then played in the inaugural ANZ Championship for the New South Wales Swifts as vice-captain for the team. Gilsenan was one of the starting seven players for the Swifts to be part of the Grand Final, where the Swifts became the inaugural winners of the ANZ Championship. After the ANZ Championship, she announced her complete retirement from netball to focus on starting a family.

In 2015 Selina got inducted into Netball NSW Hall of Fame.

Personal life
On 21 October 2006, Selina married Timothy Hornibrook (Tim Hornibrook).

On 6 July 2009, Hornibrook gave birth to a baby boy, Connor Sean. Former Swifts player Alison Broadbent gave birth to a baby girl one day later. On 15 December, 2010, Selina gave birth to her second son, Isaiah Tascar. A third boy, Kobi Christopher was born on 19 July, 2014. A fourth son, Harrison Thomas was born on the 29 December 2015.

References

External links
2008 New South Wales Swifts profile. Retrieved 16 March 2009.

1978 births
Living people
New South Wales Swifts players
Netball players at the 2006 Commonwealth Games
Commonwealth Games silver medallists for Australia
Australian people of Rotuman descent
Commonwealth Games medallists in netball
Australia international netball players
Sydney Swifts players
Rotuman people
Netball players from New South Wales
2007 World Netball Championships players
Medallists at the 2006 Commonwealth Games